Paul Yuzyk (24 June 1913 – 9 July 1986) was a Canadian historian and Senator remembered as the "father of multiculturalism." He was appointed to the Canadian Senate on 4 February 1963 on the recommendation of John Diefenbaker. He sat as a member of the Progressive Conservative Party caucus until his death.

He was an associate professor of Slavic studies and professor of history at the University of Manitoba and a professor of Russian and Soviet history at the University of Ottawa. He was the author of several books including The Ukrainians in Manitoba: A Social History (1953), Ukrainian Canadians: Their Place and Role in Canadian Life (1967), and For a Better Canada (1974). He was co-editor, with William Darcovich, of the book A Statistical Compendium on the Ukrainians in Canada 1891-1976 (1980).

Yuzyk is remembered for being an early advocate of the concept of multiculturalism, which he first broached in a senate speech on March 3, 1963. In the speech he criticized the Lester Pearson government for consecrating "Biculturalism" in the Royal Commission on Bilingualism and Biculturalism, which Yuzyk said ignored the reality that Canada was in fact a "multicultural" society.

The Paul Yuzyk Award for Multiculturalism
The Paul Yuzyk Award commemorates late Senator Yuzyk's "pioneering legacy establishing multiculturalism as one of the fundamental characteristics of Canadian identity."

In 2009, the Paul Yuzyk Award for Multiculturalism was created by the Government of Canada to "recognize individuals and groups in communities across Canada who have made exceptional contributions to multiculturalism and diversity." The award is presented annually for Lifetime Achievement or Outstanding Achievement. Candidates for the award must be nominated. The award recipient receives a certificate of honour and is asked to choose an eligible, non-profit organization to receive a $20,000 grant.

Archives 
There is a Paul Yuzyk fonds at Library and Archives Canada.

References

External links 
Yuzyk tribute site
Yuzyk, Paul - Internet Encyclopedia of Ukraine
Paul Yuzyk page on CIC website

1913 births
1986 deaths
Canadian male non-fiction writers
Canadian people of Ukrainian descent
Canadian senators from Manitoba
Progressive Conservative Party of Canada senators
Academic staff of the University of Manitoba
Academic staff of the University of Ottawa
20th-century Canadian historians
Multiculturalism activists in Canada